Annika Drazek (born 11 April 1995) is a German bobsledder and former track and field athlete.

She was a sprinter, competed at two IAAF World Youth Championships. In bobsleigh, she competes with Anja Schneiderheinze-Stöckel, with whom she won the gold medal at World Championships 2016 two-woman event.

References

External links

1995 births
Living people
German female bobsledders
German female sprinters
People from Gladbeck
Sportspeople from Münster (region)
Bobsledders at the 2018 Winter Olympics
Olympic bobsledders of Germany
21st-century German women